The 1998–99 Australian Figure Skating Championships was held in Melbourne from 25 July through 1 August 1998. Skaters competed in the disciplines of men's singles, ladies' singles, pair skating, and ice dancing across many levels, including senior, junior, novice, adult, and the pre-novice disciplines of primary and intermediate.

Senior results

Men

Ladies

Pairs

Ice dancing

External links
 results

1998 in figure skating
1999 in figure skating
Fig
Fig
Australian Figure Skating Championships